Katrina Johansson is an American guitarist from Milwaukee, Wisconsin. She released her debut extended play, Guitarsongs Volume 1, in 2005, which was notable for featuring fellow shred guitarist Michael Angelo Batio on bass. In 2007 a second EP was released, entitled Love, Surrender, Forgiveness.

Johansson cites such guitarists as Gary Moore, Yngwie Malmsteen, Jimi Hendrix, Ritchie Blackmore and Joe Satriani as influences, and Opeth, Van Halen and Soundgarden as some of her favourite bands. Other personal interests she identifies include kickboxing, rollerblading and mountain biking.

Discography
Guitarsongs Volume 1 (2005)
Love, Surrender, Forgiveness (2007)

References

External links
Official site
Katrina Johansson at Dean Guitars

American women guitarists
American heavy metal guitarists
Living people
Guitarists from Wisconsin
Musicians from Milwaukee
Year of birth missing (living people)
21st-century American women
Women in metal